The Eighth Amendment to the Constitution of Pakistan (Urdu: آئین پاکستان میں آٹھویں ترمیم) allowed the President to unilaterally dissolve the National Assembly and elected governments. The National Assembly  of Pakistan amended the Constitution of Pakistan in 1985 and the law stayed on the books until its repeal in 1997.

The bill was passed in the absence of the elected Parliament. The eighth amendment was drafted and later enforced by the technocratic-military government of General Zia-ul-Haq. The eighth amendment changed Pakistan's system of government from a parliamentary democracy to a semi-presidential system. The eighth amendment strengthened the authority of the President and also granted additional powers to dismiss the elected Prime Minister's government. These powers included the right, expressed in sub-section 2(b) inserted into Article 58, to dissolve the National Assembly (but not the Senate) if, in his or her opinion, "a situation has arisen in which the Government of the Federation cannot be carried on in accordance with the provisions of the Constitution and an appeal to the electorate is necessary." (Constitution of Pakistan, Article 58) with the consequence of dismissing the Prime Minister and his or her Cabinet.

Text
The Eighth Amendment, besides making a number of other changes to the Constitution, introduced the following clause into Article 58 of the Constitution:

Effect on democracy
General Zia-ul-Haq first used the amendment to dismiss Prime Minister Mohammad Khan Junejo for alleged corruption in May 1988. The prime minister had wanted to roll back Zia's authority. In 1988, Benazir Bhutto pledged to abolish the amendment in her election manifesto. The amendment stayed on the books however, because she did not have a sufficient number of seats in 1988 and again in 1993. From 1988 to 1996, President Ghulaam Ishaq Khan made extensive use of the eight amendment and the Article 58 2(b) to dissolve the National Assembly. President Khan used the amendment to dismiss the elected governments of Prime Ministers Benazir Bhutto and Nawaz Sharif. President Khan first used the VIII Amendment on August 6, 1990, against Bhutto on alleged cases of nepotism and the corruption. In 1993, President Ishaq Khan again used this amendment to dismiss the people-elected government of Prime Minister Nawaz Sharif. In the second instance, Prime Minister Nawaz Sharif was reinstated as prime minister by the Supreme Court, but the resulting stalemate ended with the resignations of both Khan and Sharif. The use of Article 58 2(b) was almost exclusively justified by the president as necessary, for the removal of corrupt governments that, it was asserted, had lost the confidence of the people. Elections were held each time that caused the ruling party to lose its majority or plurality in the National Assembly. It was again used in 1996 by President Farooq Ahmad Khan Leghari against his own party leader Prime Minister Benazir Bhutto in November 1996.

In 1997, the Thirteenth Amendment was passed, stripping the president of the power to dissolve the National Assembly and call for new elections, effectively reducing the presidency to a ceremonial figurehead.

Pakistan's democracy provides no means for the people to directly recall members of Parliament before the end of their terms. Consequently, the Thirteenth and Fourteenth Amendments had the effect of removing the institutional checks and balances on the Prime Minister's power, by giving him or her immunity from being legally dismissed. The power of the president's office was partially restored by the Seventeenth Amendment. The power to dissolve the National Assembly and dismiss the Prime Minister is now subject to Supreme Court approval. In 2010, the Eighteenth Amendment was passed by Parliament of Pakistan reverting the 17th Amendment at an effective and immediate course.

Eighth Amendment as a compromise
In general discourse, the Eighth Amendment has become synonymous with Article 58 2(b), which in turn is considered to be the provision that introduced the presidential power to dissolve the National Assembly. However, the Eighth Amendment was in fact a compromise between the Parliament elected in the non-party elections of  1985 and then President Gen. Zia-ul-Haq. Prior to the 1985 election, over a period of six years, Gen. Zia-ul-Haq had already made numerous amendments to the Constitution of 1973 through various Constitution Amendment Orders, the most significant being the Revival of Constitution of 1973 Order (President's Order No. 14 of 1985). That Order had in fact granted to the President even more discretion in dissolving the National Assembly. Clause (2) added to Article 58 by that Order stated: "The President may also dissolve the National Assembly in his discretion where, in his opinion, an appeal to the electorate is necessary." Note that the test of the constitutional functioning of the government was not required for the President to dissolve the National Assembly.

It must also be stated that the Eighth Amendment also caused the elected Parliament to endorse all Orders made by Gen. Zia-ul-Haq by substituting the Article 270A introduced by President's Order No. 14 of 1985 by a slightly modified version, preserving the text declaring the validity of all of his actions, including his takeover of July 5, 1977 and subsequent constitutional amendments.

It is not clear whether this explicit parliamentary approval was required for Gen. Zia's amendments to obtain legal validity, but it appears that Gen. Zia considered it desirable to obtain this approval and thus chose to compromise by watering down some of the presidential powers his amendments had granted.

See also
 Zia-ul-Haq's Islamization
 Separation of powers
 Nawaz Sharif
 Pervez Musharraf

References

08
1985 in law
Military government of Pakistan (1977–1988)